Fact or Faked: Paranormal Files is a paranormal investigation series produced by Base Productions that began airing July 15, 2010, on SyFy. The show follows a team of investigators, led by former FBI agent Ben Hansen (from Dr. M. David Hansen, business partner), who review various photographs and viral videos (mainly from the internet) of alleged paranormal activity. If a particular piece of evidence is deemed intriguing enough to warrant further investigation, they set out to recreate and explain the sighting.

Beginning episode #207 in the first half of season two, the show began to feature a "You Decide" segment in the middle of the program where a video is shown of something strange and then asks the viewing audience if they think the footage is fact or faked. After a commercial break the truth behind the video is revealed.

Cast
Recent cast (Season 2-3)
 Ben Hansen – Team leader
 Jael de Pardo – Journalist
 Bill Murphy – Lead scientist
 Austin Porter – Stunt expert
 Lanisha Cole – Photographer
 Devin Marble – Tech specialist
Former cast
 Larry Caughlan, Jr. – Effects specialist
 Chi-Lan Lieu – Photography expert
Guests
 Josh Gates – Investigator, host of Destination Truth
 Kofi Kingston - WWE wrestler

Reviews
A Variety magazine review says – "Now we know what Fox Mulder would have done after leaving "The X-Files" unit: Get his own reality-TV show!" Will Wade of Common Sense Media said the squad seemed like it was selected for the skill set rather than their readiness for TV.

Criticism
Skeptical researchers such as Karen Stollznow of the James Randi Educational Foundation (JREF) have criticized the investigating competence of the Fact or Faked team, such as the Civil War cemetery ghost case from episode 6 in particular. The examined footage involves an alleged orb and mist captured on a few frames of video, and when the FoF team fail to recreate it, they conclude it to be paranormal. Stollznow claimed that by slowing the video down frame-by-frame, something that the FoF team did not do (at least on camera), the orb and mist are supposedly revealed to be a spider on a web.

In 2010, the JREF also published a story stating that the producers of FoF attempted to get a group to alter a "paranormal video" they shot in order for it to be considered for the show. The group, the Rocky Mountain Paranormal Research Society, are paranormal claims investigators who filmed a planchette of an ouija board moving around on its own. The video was deliberately faked using a hidden string and released to the internet as a demonstration of how such tricks can be done. FoF producers who saw the video contacted the group and asked that they re-shoot the video and make the pointer move more dramatically before they would make an offer to feature the video on the show.

Episodes

Season 1 (2010)

Season 2 (2011–12)

References

External links
 
 

Syfy original programming
Paranormal reality television series
2010s American reality television series
2010 American television series debuts
2012 American television series endings